Live! You Goddamned Son of a Bitch is a concert album and video by the Revolting Cocks, consisting of live material recorded at the Cabaret Metro in Chicago, on September 4, 1987. However, Al Jourgensen has claimed in his autobiography, that the whole concert was re-recorded in Trax studio in Chicago afterwards. According to Jourgensen both Paul Barker and Chris Connelly thought the live record sounded horrible and they refused to release the original audio recording of the show. Jourgensen thought the recording was perfect but later agreed with Barker and Connelly. It is their second LP release following Big Sexy Land.

Track listing

Original album

2004 reissue

Disc 1

Disc 2

Personnel

Revolting Cocks
Alain Jourgensen - keyboards (2, 5, 8), vocals (3, 4, 10), backing vocals (6, 7), guitar (9), production 
Luc van Acker - guitar (1, 2, 5, 6, 8), bass guitar (3, 4), percussion (6), vocals (7, 9), keyboards (10)
Chris Connelly - vocals (1, 2, 5-7), keyboards (3, 4, 8-10)
Paul Barker - bass guitar (2, 5, 8-10), keyboards (3, 4, 6, 7), production
William Rieflin - drums

Additional personnel
Steve Speperi - engineer
Julian Herzfeld - engineer
Tim Powell - recording
Brian Shanley - cover design
Tom Young - cover photography

Video personnel
Louanne Ponder - dancing
Gina Tubetop - dancing
Tommy (The Mix) Nix - live sound
Timo Antilla - director
Dave Anderson - editor
David Collins - stage lighting
Frank Nardiello - stage lighting
Dave Anderson - video paint FX

2004 re-issue bonus tracks
Chris Connelly  - vocals
Alien Jourgensen - keyboards ("Stainless Steel Providers"), guitar ("P.I.L.")
Paul Barker - bass guitar
William Rieflin - drums
Mike Scaccia - guitar
Martin Atkins - drums
Terry Roberts - guitar
William Tucker - guitar

References

Revolting Cocks albums
Albums produced by Al Jourgensen
1988 live albums